The 2019–20 Liga I (also known as Casa Liga 1 for sponsorship reasons) was the 102nd season of the Liga I, the top professional league for Romanian association football clubs, which began in July 2019 and was scheduled to end in June 2020. Suspended in March 2020 because of the COVID-19 pandemic in Romania, the season resumed on 13 June and effectively ended on 5 August. It was the fifth season to take place since the play-off/play-out rule had been introduced. 

CFR Cluj were two-time defending champions, and they successfully defended their title once more. Universitatea Craiova contented for the trophy until the final fixture of the championship play-offs, and ultimately finished as runner-ups, while FCSB were unable to claim a top three spot in the table for the first time since the 2010–11 season. Because of the aforementioned situation created by the pandemic, it was decided that no club would relegate directly and the 14th-placed team would take part in the promotion/relegation play-offs instead of the 12th-placed one, which resulted in no club being relegated whatsoever.

Effects of the COVID-19 pandemic
The derby between FCSB and Universitatea Craiova on 8 March 2020 was played without spectators because of the COVID-19 pandemic. Four days later, all football leagues and competitions were suspended by the Romanian Football Federation until 31 March in regard to the COVID-19 pandemic in Romania. In May, it was announced that the Liga I would restart on the second weekend of June. 

The first match meant to be played at the resumption was Universitatea Craiova versus FC Botoșani, on 12 June at 20:00 EEST (UTC+3), but was postponed after the latter club's doctor was tested positive for the virus. This was the second game announced to be postponed on the same day after Dinamo București versus Chindia Târgoviște, which was scheduled for 13 June. Nevertheless, the season resumed with three other matches on 13 June.

After the restart, many matches were postponed due to COVID-19 cases that appeared inside the teams. At the end the season, two matches were cancelled in the play-off after Coronavirus cases from Astra Giurgiu and five matches were canceled in the play-out, after the emergence of the same issue at Dinamo București. The final league tables were approved without these matches and it was announced that only the last place, Chindia Târgoviște, would play a promotion/relegation play-off, with the rest of the teams being spared from relegation and the format being changed from 14 teams to 16 teams starting with the next season.

Teams
The league consists of 14 teams: twelve teams from the 2018–19 Liga I and two new teams from the 2018–19 Liga II.

Teams promoted to the Liga I

The first club to be promoted was Academica Clinceni, following their 2–1 win against Argeș Pitești on 24 May 2019. Academica will play in the Liga I for the first time in their history.

The second club to be promoted was Chindia Târgoviște, following their 4–1 win against Luceafărul Oradea on 25 May 2019. AFC Chindia will play in the Liga I for the first time in their history, but the city of Târgoviște, returned in the Liga I after 21 years of absence, where was last time represented by FCM Târgoviște, named between 1996 and 2003 as CF Chindia, club that was also the first club of the city and which was replaced by the new club (AFC Chindia) after some internal conflicts.

Teams relegated to the Liga II

The first club to be relegated was Concordia Chiajna, which were relegated on 22 May 2019 following a 0–2 defeat against Dunărea Călărași, ending their 8-year stay in the top flight.

The second club to be relegated was Dunărea Călărași, which were relegated on 2 June 2019 following a 1–2 defeat against FC Hermannstadt, ending their 1-year stay in the top flight.

Venues

Personnel and kits

Note: Flags indicate national team as has been defined under FIFA eligibility rules. Players and Managers may hold more than one non-FIFA nationality.

Managerial changes

Regular season
In the regular season the 14 teams will meet twice, a total of 26 matches per team, with the top 6 advancing to the Championship round and the bottom 8 qualifying for Relegation round.

Table

Results

Positions by round

Championship play-offs
The top six teams from Regular season will meet twice (10 matches per team) for places in 2020–21 UEFA Champions League and 2020–21 UEFA Europa League as well as deciding the league champion. Teams start the Championship round with their points from the Regular season halved, rounded upwards, and no other records carried over from the Regular season.

Championship play-off table

Championship play-off results

Positions by round

Relegation play-outs
The bottom eight teams from regular season met twice (14 matches per team) to contest against relegation. Teams started the Relegation round with their points from the Regular season halved, rounded upwards, and no other records carried over from the Regular season. The winner of the Relegation round finished 7th in the overall season standings, the second placed team – 8th, and so on, with the last placed team in the Relegation round being 14th.

Relegation play-outs table

Relegation play-outs results

Positions by round

Promotion/relegation play-offs
The 14th-placed team of the Liga I faces the 3rd-placed team of the Liga II.

Season statistics

Top scorers
Updated to matches played on 16 June 2020.

Hat-tricks

Clean sheets
Updated to matches played on 9 March 2020.

Discipline
As of 9 March 2020

Player
Most yellow cards: 9
 Bradley Diallo (Chindia Târgoviște)
 Bogdan Țîru (Viitorul Constanța)1
 Valentin Mihăilă (Universitatea Craiova)
 Nicandro Breeveld (Politehnica Iași)
1 Bogdan Țîru was transferred to Jagiellonia Białystok during the winter transfer window.

Most red cards: 3
 Răzvan Tincu (Sepsi OSK)

Club
Most yellow cards: 81
Politehnica Iași
Most red cards: 6
FCSB
Voluntari

Attendances

Champion squad

Awards

Liga I Team of the Season

References

External links
 

2019-20
2019–20 in Romanian football
ro
Association football events postponed due to the COVID-19 pandemic